Buzzwick Airport  is a privately owned, public use airport located three nautical miles (6 km) south of the central business district of Carleton, a village in Monroe County, Michigan, United States. It is owned and operated by Buzzwick Airport LLC. Current Airport manager is Mitchell Noble. It was formerly known as Wickenheiser Airport when it was owned and managed by Cletus Wickenheiser.

Facilities and aircraft 
The airport covers an area of 17 acres at an elevation of 610 feet (186 m) above mean sea level. It has one runway with turf surfaces: 18/36 is 2,575 by 60 feet (785 x 18 m).

No fuel is available at the airport.

For the 12-month period ending December 31, 2020, the airport had 732 general aviation aircraft operations, an average of 31 per month. At that time there were six aircraft based at this airport, all single-engine airplanes.

References

External links 
 Aerial image as of March 1999 from USGS The National Map
 Michigan Department of Transportation - General Aviation Airports Directory 

Airports in Michigan
Airports in Monroe County, Michigan